Peter Salama (1968 – 23 January 2020) was an Australian epidemiologist who worked for UNICEF (2002–16) and the World Health Organization (2016–19). He was particularly known for his work at both organisations managing their responses to Ebola epidemics in Africa. Richard Horton, editor of The Lancet, described him as "a loyal and committed health advocate and multilateralist" who "brought depth and strength to WHO".

Biography
Salama gained his medical degree from the University of Melbourne and a degree in public health from Harvard University.

His early career included positions at Tufts University and at the U.S. Centers for Disease Control and Prevention, from which he was seconded to the UN High Commissioner for Refugees after the September 11 attacks. He also worked in Asia and Africa for the charities Médecins Sans Frontières and Concern Worldwide. In 2002, Salama started to work for UNICEF as Chief of Health and Nutrition in Afghanistan (2002–04), where he was credited by the former public health minister, Suraya Dalil, as facilitating the establishment of a fair system of health care in the country. He then served as the agency's Chief of Global Health and Principal Advisor on HIV/AIDS, New York (2004–09) and Ethiopia and Zimbabwe representative (2009–15). In 2015, he was appointed UNICEF's Regional Director for the Middle East and North Africa, based in Jordan. In this role, he managed the agency's international work on Ebola, and also oversaw programmes in Syria, Iraq and Yemen.

In 2016, he joined the World Health Organization (WHO) in a newly created position as head of their Health Emergencies Programme. He led the agency's work during the end of the West African Ebola epidemic, and the subsequent Ebola outbreak in Équateur province, Democratic Republic of the Congo (2018), as well as the epidemic centred on Kivu province (2018–20). He was appointed head of WHO's Universal Health Coverage in March 2019, a position that he held until his death. Other responsibilities included board membership of GAVI (from 2019) and the Partnership for Maternal, Newborn & Child Health.

His published research was in the areas of HIV, infectious diseases for which there are vaccines, nutrition, mother and child health, and health issues relating to war, refugees and emergencies.

Salama was married; he and his wife had three sons. He died from a heart attack on 23 January 2020 in Geneva, Switzerland, at the age of 51.

Selected publications
Reviews

Research papers

References

1968 births
2020 deaths
Australian epidemiologists
Melbourne Medical School alumni
Harvard School of Public Health alumni